The term 2016 Haitian presidential election may refer to:

February 2016 Haitian presidential election 
November 2016 Haitian presidential election